Kazakhstan, has serious environmental issues such as radiation from nuclear testing sites, the shrinking of the Aral sea, and desertification of former agricultural land. These issues are due in large part to Kazakhstan's years under the Soviet Union.

Partly because of the country's enormous semi-arid steppe, the Soviet government used Kazakhstan as its nuclear testing site. Along with near-absent pollution controls, this has contributed to an alarmingly high rate of disease in many rural areas. Kazakhstan has identified at least two major ecological disasters within its borders: the shrinking of the Aral Sea, and radioactive contamination at the Semipalatinsk nuclear testing facility (in fact a large zone south of Kourchatov (Курчатов)) and along the Chinese border.

The Central Asian Regional Environmental Center is located in Kazakhstan, which fosters regional cooperation on environmental issues.

Most of Kazakhstan’s water supply has been polluted by industrial and agricultural runoff and, in some places, radioactivity. The Aral Sea, which is shared with Uzbekistan, has shrunk to three separate bodies of water because of water drawdowns in its tributary rivers. A Soviet-era biological weapons site is a threat because it is located on a former island in the Aral Sea that is now connected with the mainland. The reduction in the Aral Sea’s water surface has exacerbated regional climatic extremes, and agricultural soil has been damaged by salt deposits and eroded by wind. Desertification has eliminated substantial tracts of agricultural land. Plants in industrial centers lack controls on effluents into the air and water. The Samey region in the northeast has long-term radiation contamination from Soviet-era weapons testing. The Ministry of Environmental Protection is underfunded and given low priority. Some new environmental regulation of the oil industry began in 2003, but new oil operations on Kazakhstan’s Caspian coast add to that sea’s already grave pollution. International programs to save the Aral and Caspian seas have not received meaningful cooperation from Kazakhstan or other member nations.

Kazakhstan had a 2018 Forest Landscape Integrity Index mean score of 8.23/10, ranking it 26th globally out of 172 countries.

Aral Sea

Soviet irrigation projects begun in the 1960s and other environmental challenges have severely depleted this once massive inland sea and by 2007, it had shrunk to 10 percent of its original size.

Efforts to revive the Aral Sea

The efforts included Syr Darya Control & Northern Aral Sea (NAS) project. The $86 million NAS project, funded jointly by the World Bank through a loan of $65 million and the Government of Kazakhstan which covered the rest, was designed to mitigate the environmental and economic damage to the region, sustain and increase agriculture and fishing in the Syr Darya basin and secure the continued existence of the Northern Aral Sea (also known as the Small Sea) by improving environmental and ecological conditions in the delta area.

In addition, three revival programs were designed for implementation in the Aral Sea Basin (ASBP 1, ASBP 2 and ASBP 3). The most detailed and comprehensive of these, ASBP 3, covers the 2011-2015 period and was developed during Kazakhstan’s presidency of the executive committee of IFAS.

References

Issues
Kazakhstan